The Trenton Line is a route of the SEPTA Regional Rail (commuter rail) system. The route serves the northeastern suburbs of Philadelphia, Pennsylvania with service in Bucks County along the Delaware River to Trenton, New Jersey.

Route
Trenton Line trains operate along a four-track line from 30th Street Station via the Philadelphia Zoo (without stopping there), to North Philadelphia, before running parallel to I-95 and then US 13 for several miles. It crosses the Delaware River at Trenton, New Jersey before making its final stop at Trenton Transit Center, which is also served by Amtrak and New Jersey Transit trains.

The route is part of the middle leg of Amtrak's Northeast Corridor; all 11 of Amtrak's Northeast Corridor services run along this line. The line's termini, 30th Street and Trenton Transit Center, have long been among the busiest Amtrak stations in the country. On weekdays, Amtrak connections are also available at North Philadelphia and Cornwells Heights. Connecting Trenton Line service is listed in timetables for NJ Transit's Northeast Corridor Line, of which Trenton Transit Center is the southern terminus.

History

Electrified service between Philadelphia and Trenton began on June 29, 1930.

Between 1984–2010 the route was designated R7 Trenton as part of SEPTA's diametrical reorganization of its lines. Trenton Line trains operated through the city center to the Chestnut Hill East Line on the ex-Reading side of the system. The R-number naming system was dropped on July 25, 2010. , most Trenton Line trains continue through Center City to the Chestnut Hill East Line, while some trains terminate at Temple University or continue to other destinations.

The Trenton Line usually has two push-pull electric-locomotive-hauled trains on the morning express runs and two on the evening express runs. Each train is usually made up of 6 coach trailers made by Bombardier with ACS-64 locomotives hauling them.

SEPTA activated positive train control on the Trenton Line on May 1, 2017.

Stations 

The Trenton Line includes the following stations north of the Center City Commuter Connection; stations indicated with gray background are closed. All stations within the Philadelphia city limits have a ticket office for purchasing ticket(s) to ride the Trenton line. Many stations outside the city limits have a ticket office as well, however they have shorter hours (most outside the city limits are closed on weekends) and fewer amenities than the ticket offices inside the stations within Philadelphia. Cornwells Heights station is considered a popular station on the route as it is the busiest SEPTA Regional Rail station outside of Center City, and serves Amtrak trains as well.

Ridership 
Between FY 2008–FY 2018 yearly ridership on the Trenton Line has ranged from 3.1–3.6 million.

Notes

References

External links 

SEPTA Regional Rail
Pennsylvania Railroad lines